The 2006 Tecate Grand Prix of Monterrey was the third round of the 2006 Bridgestone Presents the Champ Car World Series Powered by Ford season, held on May 29, 2006 on the Fundidora Park street circuit in Monterrey, Mexico.  Sébastien Bourdais took the pole and the race victory, his third consecutive to open the season.  The race was the sixth and final Champ Car race to take place at Fundidora Park.

Qualifying results

Race

Caution flags

Notes

 New Track Record Sébastien Bourdais 1:13.253 (Qualifying Session #2)
 New Race Lap Record Sébastien Bourdais 1:14.529
 New Race Record Sébastien Bourdais 1:39:50.252
 Average Speed 96.099 mph

Championship standings after the race

Drivers' Championship standings

 Note: Only the top five positions are included.

External links
 Friday Qualifying Results 
 Saturday Qualifying Results 
 Race Results

Monterrey
Grand Prix of Monterrey
21st century in Monterrey
2006 in Mexican motorsport